Valdas Dabkus (born March 26, 1984) is a Lithuanian professional basketball player. Dabkus plays at the small forward and power forward positions.

National team career 
Dabkus previously represented the Lithuanian youth squads, and won a silver medal with the Lithuanian Under-19 Team, at the 2003 FIBA Under-19 World Championship. He also won a bronze medal with the Lithuanian Under-20 Team, at the 2004 FIBA Europe Under-20 Championship.

References 

Living people
1984 births
KK Włocławek players
Lithuanian men's basketball players
Power forwards (basketball)
Small forwards
Basketball players from Kaunas
BK Liepājas Lauvas players